Poron Absorba S.A. of Troyes, was a French textile and garment company founded in 1816 as Établissements Poron. Its head office was located at 33 avenue des Martyrs-de-la-Résistance and its main factory on rue Suchetet at Vendeuvre-sur-Barse.

The company was bought by Groupe Zannier, which became Kidiliz in 2016. Kidiliz went bankrupt in September 2019, most of its employees were laid off and the assets were bought by 7 other companies.

Automobile 
Poron manufactured an automobile in 1898. It was a rear-engined opposed-piston "motorcycle" with friction-drive and tiller steering.

References

Clothing companies of France
Clothing manufacturers
Infants' clothing
1816 establishments in France
2019 disestablishments in France
Defunct manufacturing companies of France
Defunct motor vehicle manufacturers of France